The Old Parish Burying Ground is the oldest protestant cemetery in Windsor, Nova Scotia and one of the oldest in Canada.  The graveyard was located adjacent to the first protestant church in Windsor (1788). The oldest marker is dated 1771, twelve years after the New England Planters began to settle the area.

Notable interments 

 Issac Deschamps, participated in the Bay of Fundy Campaign (1755)
Rev. William Ellis (clergy person)
 Winckworth Tonge, grandson of Winckworth Tonge
 Rev. William Croscomb
 William Hersey Otis Haliburton
 Hon Nathaniel Ray Thomas (d.1791), unmarked grave

See also 
 Little Dutch (Deutsch) Church
 Garrison Cemetery (Annapolis Royal, Nova Scotia)
 Royal Navy Burying Ground (Halifax, Nova Scotia)
 Old Burying Ground (Halifax, Nova Scotia)
 Hillcrest Cemetery (Lunenburg, Nova Scotia)

References

External links 
 

History of Nova Scotia